Teddy Newton is an American animator and voice actor best known for his work at Pixar Animation Studios.

Career
Newton has notably worked as a storyboard artist for 2 Stupid Dogs, The Iron Giant, and Dexter's Laboratory, and as a character designer on The Iron Giant, The Incredibles, and Ratatouille, all three of which were directed by Brad Bird. He also co-wrote the short film Jack-Jack Attack and provided the voices of multiple characters in movies such as The Incredibles, Ratatouille, WALL-E, and Up, as well as the Chatter Telephone in Toy Story 3 and Mini Buzz in Toy Story Toons: Small Fry. His directorial debut was with the short Day & Night, which was nominated for Best Animated Short Film Oscar at the 83rd Academy Awards.

By November 2012, Newton was slated to direct an untitled Pixar feature film, with Derek Connolly writing the screenplay. As of 2023, no further updates have surfaced.

In 2018, it was announced that Newton would direct Sneaks.

In 2019, it was announced that Newton will create the story for and co-direct a Funko film with Mark Dindal for the Warner Animation Group. In February 2021, Newton was confirmed to write the screenplay for it, in addition to his story-writing and directing duties.

Personal life
Newton is married to Stacey, a story manager at Pixar Animation Studios. They have a son Ace, born on January 21, 2011.

Work
Character designer
 The Iron Giant (1999)
 The Incredibles (2004)
 Ratatouille (2007)
 Presto (2008)

Voice actor
 The Incredibles (2004)
 Ratatouille (2007)
 WALL-E (2008)
 Up (2009)
 Toy Story 3 (2010)
 Toy Story Toons (2011)
 Mission Impossible: Ghost Protocol (2011) (uncredited)
 Mission Impossible: Rogue Nation (2015) (uncredited)

Visual development artist
 The Iron Giant (1999)
 Osmosis Jones (2001)
 Up (2009)

Director
 Boy's Night Out (2003)
 Day & Night (2010)

Storyboard artist
 2 Stupid Dogs (1994)
 Dexter's Laboratory (1996)
 The Iron Giant'' (1999)

References

External links

American animated film directors
Animators from California
American male voice actors
California Institute of the Arts alumni
Living people
Pixar people
Year of birth missing (living people)